The A & P Food Stores Building in St. Louis, Missouri, is historically significant in part because it is rare in Saint Louis as a small commercial building having an Art Deco building design.  Most others were either residential or larger commercial buildings.  It also serves as an example of the work of Saum Architects, a not-well-known architectural firm of Saint Louis in the early 1900s.  And it is also significant as having been one of the first supermarkets in St. Louis that was developed to serve automobile-owning customers, providing parking and convenient "one-stop shopping".

There were as many as 84 A & P stores in the city, 20 being supermarkets and the others being cash and carry stores; this building is one of the last surviving of these, and it was among those which kept operating up until A & P entirely left the city in 1979–1980.

It was listed on the National Register of Historic Places in 2000.

See also
 The Great Atlantic & Pacific Tea Company, food store chain

References

Art Deco architecture in Missouri
Buildings and structures in St. Louis
Commercial buildings completed in 1940
Commercial buildings on the National Register of Historic Places in Missouri
The Great Atlantic & Pacific Tea Company
National Register of Historic Places in St. Louis
Grocery store buildings